Herlin Riley (born February 15, 1957) is an American jazz drummer and a member of the Lincoln Center Jazz Orchestra led by Wynton Marsalis. 
 
A native of New Orleans, Riley started on the drums when he was three. He played trumpet through high school, but he went back to drums in college. After graduating, he spent three years as a member of a band led by Ahmad Jamal. He has worked often with Wynton Marsalis as a member of the Jazz at Lincoln Center Orchestra and of Marsalis's small groups. He has also worked with George Benson, Harry Connick, Jr., and Marcus Roberts.

Riley played a large part in developing the drum parts for Wynton Marsalis's Pulitzer Prize-winning album, Blood on the Fields. He is a lecturer in percussion for the jazz studies program at the Bienen School of Music at Northwestern University in Evanston, Illinois.

Discography

As leader
 Watch What You're Doing (Criss Cross, 2000)
 Cream of the Crescent (Criss Cross, 2005)
 New Direction (Mack Avenue, 2016)
 Perpetual Optimism (Mack Avenue, 2019)

As sideman
With Ahmad Jamal
 Digital Works (Atlantic, 1985)
 Live at the Montreal Jazz Festival 1985 (Atlantic, 1985)
 Rossiter Road (Atlantic, 1986)
 Blue Moon (Jazz Village, 2012)

With Marcus Roberts
 Deep in the Shed (Novus, 1989)

With Dr. Lonnie Smith
 Rise Up! (Palmetto Records, 2008)

With Wynton Marsalis
 1988 The Majesty of the Blues
 1988 Uptown Ruler: Soul Gestures in Southern Blue, Vol. 2
 1990 Crescent City Christmas Card
 1990 Standard Time, Vol. 2: Intimacy Calling
 1990 Standard Time, Vol. 3: The Resolution of Romance
 1990 Tune in Tomorrow
 1991 Blue Interlude
 1991 Levee Low Moan: Soul Gestures in Southern Blue, Vol. 3
 1992 Citi Movement
 1993 In This House, On This Morning
 1994 Jazz at Lincoln Center Presents: The Fire of the Fundamentals
 1994 Jazz at Lincoln Center: They Came to Swing
 1994 Joe Cool's Blues
 1996 Jump Start and Jazz
 1997 Blood on the Fields
 1999 Big Train
 1999 Live at the Village Vanguard
 1999 Live in Swing City: Swingin with the Duke
 1999 Reeltims
 1999 Standard Time, Vol. 6: Mr. Jelly Lord
 1999 The Marciac Suit
 2000 Selections from the Village Vanguard Box
 2004 Trios
 2004 Unforgivable Blackness: The Rise and Fall of Jack Johnson
 2005 A Love Supreme
 2005 Don't Be Afraid: The Music of Charles Mingus
 2005 Higher Ground Hurricane Benefit Relief Concert
 2006 Cast of Cats
 2007 Standards & Ballads
 2009 Christmas Jazz Jam
 2012 Swinging into the 21st 
 2012 The Music of America
 2013 The Spiritual Side of Wynton Marsalis

[With Bennie Wallace]
 2002 Bennie Wallace In Berlin

References

External links

 HerlinRiley.com - official website
 Drummerworld biography
 Herlin Riley Interview at allaboutjazz.com
 Herlin Riley Interview NAMM Oral History Library (2017)

1957 births
Living people
American jazz drummers
Jazz musicians from New Orleans
20th-century American drummers
American male drummers
20th-century American male musicians
American male jazz musicians
Fairview Baptist Church Marching Band members
Jazz at Lincoln Center Orchestra members
Mack Avenue Records artists
Criss Cross Jazz artists